Negri is an Italian surname that may refer to

Ada Negri, an Italian poet
Antenore Negri (1898–1970), Italian Olympic runner
Antonio Negri, a political philosopher
Cesare Negri, the late Renaissance dancing-master
Costache Negri, Romanian writer and politician
Diego Negri (born 1971), Italian Olympic sailor
Francesco Negri (disambiguation) (several people)
Gaetano Negri (1838–1902), Italian geologist, writer, and politician
Count Ignacio de Negri, 19th-century Spanish soldier
Joe Negri, an American jazz guitarist
Luca Negri (born 1973), Italian Olympic sprint canoer
Marcantonio Negri, an Italian composer of the early Baroque era
Marco Negri (born 1970), Italian association football player
Marco Negri (volleyball) (born 1955), Italian volleyball player
Mario De Negri (1901–1978), Italian Olympic sprint runner
Pola Negri, a Polish film actress
Sara Negri, Italian mathematical logician in Finland

Italian-language surnames